La-ba'shum of Uruk was the eighth Sumerian ruler in the First Dynasty of Uruk (ca. 26th century BC), according to the Sumerian King List.

|-

Sumerian kings
26th-century BC Sumerian kings
Kings of Uruk